Skinless is an American death metal band from Glens Falls, New York. The band formed in 1992 and disbanded in 2011, but reformed in 2013.

History
Skinless was formed by Ryan Wade and Noah Carpenter in the town of South Glens Falls, New York. After relocating to various New York towns and cities such as Saratoga Springs, Clifton Park, and Cohoes, the band settled in Troy, New York. 

Skinless is known for its consistently intense performances, as well as for its lyrical mix of end-of-the-world cynicism and comedy, which at times satirizes well known death metal lyrics from bands such as Carcass and Cannibal Corpse, and death metal in general. These lyrical themes are demonstrated in songs such as "The Optimist", about a crumbling human society, and "Tug of War Intestines", which depicts children playing schoolyard games with a surgery patient's internal organs. The band has occasionally brought the "Skinless Girl" on stage and let her be roughed up, covered in fake blood, while the band performed. Earlier in the band's career, Skinless handed out long tubes of foam for the audience to beat each other while the band played. These tubes were nicknamed "The Logs of Brutality".

Skinless's 1998 debut album, Progression Towards Evil, was an independent release which garnered the band high praise by fans and critics. In June 2010, Skinless played a reunion show with the line-up from the first 2 full-length albums. Guitarist Noah Carpenter wanted Skinless to continue in this formation but the band's "fire" was not there anymore. In April 2011, Skinless officially split up, but soon after announced a farewell performance at Maryland Deathfest 2011. All the members are continuing as musicians in other bands.

Skinless reformed in 2013 with the original line up from Progression Towards Evil. The band then added a second guitarist, Dave Matthews.

Skinless released a new album entitled Only the Ruthless Remain on June 2, 2015, their first since Trample the Weak, Hurdle the Dead in 2006.

Members 

Current members
 Noah Carpenter – guitars (1992–2011, 2013–present)
 Joe Keyser – bass (1997–2011, 2013–present)
 Bob Beaulac – drums (1997–2002, 2003–2011, 2013–present)
 Sherwood Webber IV – vocals (1994–2004, 2010–2011, 2013–present)
 Dave Matthews – guitars (2013–present)

Former members
 Dan Bell – vocals (1992)
 Ted Monsour – bass, vocals (1992–1994)
 Ryan Wade – vocals, drums (1992–1996)
 Jeff Vanloan – bass (1993)
 Mike Levy – vocals (1993–1994)
 Martin Oprencak – vocals (1994)
 Adam Lewis – bass (1995–1997)
 Joe Clark – drums (1996)
 George Torres – drums (2002)
 John Longstreth – drums (2003)
 Jason Keyser – vocals (2005–2009)
 Chris Mahar – drums (2006–2009)

Timeline

Discography

Albums 
 Progression Towards Evil (1998)
 Foreshadowing Our Demise (2001)
 From Sacrifice to Survival (2003)
 Trample the Weak, Hurdle the Dead (2006)
 Only the Ruthless Remain (2015)
 Savagery (2018)

Other releases
 Demo (demo, 1994)
 Swollen Heaps (demo, 1995)
 Frozen Dawn (compilation, 1996)
 Common Ground: A Compilation of Upstate NY's Hardest (split, 1997)
 Maledictive Pigs / Skinless (split, 2001)
 Miscreant (EP, 2002)
 Skinflick (DVD, 2004)
 Regression Towards Evil: 1994–1998 ("best of" compilation, 2007)

References

Relapse Records artists
Musical groups established in 1992
Musical groups disestablished in 2011
Death metal musical groups from New York (state)